Laurențiu Cătălin Iorga (born 17 March 1988) is a Romanian professional footballer who plays as a winger or forward for Viitorul Ianca.

Career 

Iorga started his career at Oțelul Galați, the club where he played as a junior. With Oțelul, Iorga became Romanian champion in 2011, and played in the Champions League. He played in four games in the most important tournament in Europe.

On 9 January 2014, it was announced that Iorga has signed for Astra in a deal worth €500k.

After only six months at Giurgiu, Iorga moved to Pandurii Târgu Jiu where he signed a contract for two years.

In August 2015, Iorga reached a deal for two seasons with FC Voluntari.

In August 2017, he signed a one-year deal with Wigry Suwałki.

Honours

Oţelul Galaţi
Liga I: 2010–11
Supercupa României: 2011

References

External links

1988 births
Living people
People from Babadag
Romanian footballers
Association football midfielders
ASC Oțelul Galați players
FC Astra Giurgiu players
CS Pandurii Târgu Jiu players
FC Voluntari players
Bałtyk Gdynia players
Liga I players
Expatriate footballers in Poland
Romania under-21 international footballers